Starlings is a British comedy-drama written by Steve Edge and Matt King who also play the roles of Fergie and Uncle Loz. It is one of the few recent television comedy series commissioned and aired on Sky 1. In September 2013, Sky1 announced it was cancelling the show after two seasons.

Premise
Terry and Jan Starling have been happily married for many years, living in Matlock, Derbyshire. They have three children. Their eldest, Bell, is in her early 20s and is pregnant by her boyfriend Reuben. Graham, known as Gravy, has left school but is currently unemployed. Charlotte, known as Charlie, is the youngest, and works with Terry in his capacity as a self-employed electrician. other members of the family include Terry's elderly father, Bill, and Jan's nephew Fergie. In the first episode the family meet Lawrence, known as Loz, for the first time. He is Bill's long lost son, and therefore Terry's half brother.

Cast and characters

Episodes

Series 1 (2012)

Series 2 (2013)

DVD release
The first series of Starlings was released on DVD on 9 July 2012.

References

External links

2012 British television series debuts
2013 British television series endings
2010s British comedy-drama television series
British comedy-drama television shows
Sky UK original programming
English-language television shows
Television shows set in Derbyshire
Television shows shot at Teddington Studios